Linda Davis is the second album by country music artist Linda Davis, released in 1992. Her final album for Liberty Records, it produced two non-charting singles in "There's Something 'Bout Loving You" and "He Isn't My Affair Anymore". The track "Just Enough Rope" would later be cut by Rick Trevino, who released it as a single in 1994. Trevino also released this same song in Spanish under the title "Bastante Cordón". Ronnie Milsap also recorded "L.A. to the Moon" on his 1991 album Greatest Hits, Vol. 3.

Production
The album was produced by Jimmy Bowen and Davis.

Track listing
"There's Something 'Bout Loving You" (Chris Waters, Tom Shapiro) – 3:20
"Years After You" (Thom Schuyler) – 3:07
"He Isn't My Affair Anymore" (DeWayne Blackwell) – 3:04
"Just Enough Rope" (Karen Staley, Steve Dean) – 3:34
"Tonight She's Climbing the Walls" (Craig Bickhardt) – 3:31
"Love Happens" (Wayland Holyfield, Verlon Thompson) – 3:53
"The Boy Back Home" (Gary Harrison, Tim Mensy) – 4:15
"Do I Do It to You Too?" (Waters, Shapiro) – 2:32
"Isn't That What You Told Her?" (Staley, Gary Harrison) – 3:20
"L.A. to the Moon" (Susan Longacre, Lonnie Wilson) – 3:23

Personnel
Linda Davis: Lead Vocals
Linda Davis, Lang Scott, Lisa Silver, Harry Stinson: Background Vocals
Billy Joe Walker Jr.: Acoustic Guitar
Brent Rowan, Billy Joe Walker, Jr.: Electric Guitar
Bruce Bouton: Steel Guitar
Walt Cunningham: Synthesizer
John Barlow Jarvis: Keyboards
Rob Hajacos: Fiddle
Terry McMillan: Harmonica
Michael Rhodes: Bass guitar
Eddie Bayers: Drums

References

Linda Davis albums
1992 albums
Liberty Records albums
Albums produced by Jimmy Bowen